Kafeel Ahmed (1 January 1979 – 2 August 2007) was an aeronautical engineer and one of two terrorists behind the 2007 UK terrorist incidents. He died of injuries sustained in the second of these incidents, a vehicle-ramming attack at Glasgow Airport.

Biography
Ahmed was an Indian Muslim born in Bangalore, India, and raised in Saudi Arabia during his doctor parents' tenure there. His brother is Sabeel Ahmed, who was also arrested in the aftermath of the attack. A suicide note left behind indicates that the passenger of the vehicle, Bilal Abdullah, and himself, intended to die in the attack.

Mobile phone records have shown that, during his 2005–2007 stay in India, Ahmed had frequent communications with Malta, the UK, Finland, Saudi Arabia and Oman. In May 2007, prior to departing to Britain from his native Bangalore, he entrusted his mother with the hard drive of his computer, which he said contained some important information on his "project."  The drive was handed over to police for analysis. It was revealed that the drive contained speeches by al-Qaeda leader Osama bin Laden, propaganda against the United Kingdom and the United States, some jihadist literature and the plight of the Muslims in Iraq, Afghanistan and Chechnya. It transpired that Ahmed attentively followed campaigns in Iraq, Afghanistan and Palestine, and frequented Islamist chat rooms on the internet. Digital material found included graphic depictions of real-life occurrences of torture in Chechnya, and hundreds of bomb designs from the internet.

According to police sources, Ahmed was an engineer pursuing a PhD in computational fluid dynamics at Anglia Ruskin University, in the UK, on the topic of "Computational Approach to Ink-jet Printing of Tactile Maps." He would have earned a bachelor of mechanical engineering from India, and an M.Phil. degree in aeronautical engineering from Queen's University Belfast. As an aeronautics engineer, Ahmed worked from December 2005 to August 2006 for Infotech, an Indian outsourcing company servicing clients such as Airbus and Boeing, before resigning abruptly. It is possible that he had access to sensitive design information about various aviation companies. He was often mistakenly referred to as a medical doctor in news reports following the terrorist incidents.

Ahmed might have been in the UK as early as September 2003. He is believed to have organised a Chechnya Day Meeting in his native city of Bangalore, in February 2006. He was a member of the Tablighi Jamaat missionary sect.

2007 terrorist incidents

Ahmed and Bilal Abdullah were identified as the men who planted car bombs in London on 29 June 2007 and attempted an attack at Glasgow Airport the next day. Ahmed was arrested by Strathclyde Police (Scotland) in the aftermath of the latter incident and was hospitalised at the Glasgow Royal Infirmary in critical condition. He had suffered burns to 90% of his body and was not expected to survive—he had already been revived twice by 4 July. The Sun reported Britain's National Health Service was paying over £5,000 a day to keep him alive, while security sources said this amount reaches £30,000 when security costs are included.

A Rediff news report reveals that Ahmed was planning on constructing a housing complex on the outskirts of Bangalore, where Islamic Sharia law would be forcibly implemented on residents, despite India's secular constitution and separation of religion and state. In January 2007, Kafeel had disrupted a meeting organised by a Bangalore-based organisation to discuss reform in Islam. Prior to the Glasgow attack, he had visited numerous Islamist websites, including that of the Jamaat al Dawa, the parent organisation of Islamic terrorist group Lashkar-e-Toiba.

Investigations are being carried out to unearth Ahmed's possible involvement with the deadly 2005 Indian Institute of Science shooting, an attack with unknown suspects that are still at large.

Death
On 2 August 2007, Strathclyde Police reported that Ahmed had died in the Glasgow Royal Infirmary.

References

External links
British Terror Probe Focuses on Doctors
Glasgow bombers 'also behind London attacks'
NHS terror plot: police investigate global email network used by 'bombers'

1979 births
2007 deaths
June 2007 UK terrorist incidents
Alumni of Anglia Ruskin University
Alumni of Queen's University Belfast
Indian expatriates in Saudi Arabia
Indian Islamists
People from Bangalore
Deaths from fire